"Come Closer" is a song by the English musician Miles Kane and was released on 18 February 2011. In interviews he has described this song as sleazy. The song was inspired by John Lennon. It was released as a limited run on 7" vinyl and as digital download. The first 500 7" came with a signed set of lyrics by Miles Kane.

Music video
The official video was released online on 16 December 2010. It was filmed at a studio in North London called the Mile Way club. The director of the video was Dan Sully. The video features Daisy Lowe who is a close friend of Miles, and Hope Watson.

Track listing

Chart performance

Release history

References 

2011 singles
2011 songs
Sony Music singles
Songs written by Miles Kane